František Trávníček (17 August 1888 – 6 June 1961) was a Czechoslovak Slavist, bohemist, professor of the Czech language at Masaryk University and an academician of the Czechoslovak Academy of Sciences. After February 1948, he was also a politician of the Communist Party of Czechoslovakia and promoted Marxist interpretations of linguistics.

Biography 
Trávníček was born in to a middle-class family. He lost his parents at an early age and was raised by his grandparents.

In the years 1907–1911 he studied Slavic and Indo-European studies at the Faculty of Philosophy of Charles University. He was especially influenced by his meeting with the Russian Slavist and dialectologist Aleksey Shakhmatov. After graduating from university, he taught at a secondary school in Prague.

From 1911 to 1915 he was secretary of the Dialectological Commission of the Czech Academy of Sciences and Arts in Prague.

In 1915 he was sent to the Russian front. He surrendered and rose to the rank of staff captain of the Czechoslovak legions and became the editor of the Československé listy newspaper.

In 1920 he passed a habilitation at the Charles University. From 1921 to 1927 he was a visiting professor of Czech grammar at the University of Brno. In 1927, he received the title of ordinary professor there.

In 1945 he joined the Communist Party of Czechoslovakia. After 1948, he took a critical position in relation to structuralism in Czech linguistics, although before and during the Second World War he was an adherent of structuralism, as well as a member of the Prague Linguistic Circle; in the 1950s he criticized structuralism from a Marxist position.

From 1948 to 1959 he was rector of Masaryk University, at the same time  was a member of parliament (1948–1960).

He founded the Brno branch of the Institute of Czech Language of the Czechoslovak Academy of Sciences and was its first director.

Works 
 Studie o českém vidu slovesném, 1923.
 Moravská nářečí, 1926.
 Jazyk a národ, 1930.
 Neslovesné věty v češtině. Díl I, Věty interjekční, 1930.
 Neslovesné věty v češtině. Díl 2., Věty nominální, 1931.
 Historická mluvnice československá, 1935.
 Spisovná česká výslovnost. 2. vydání, 1940.
 Stručná mluvnice česká. 1. vyd. 1941, další 1943, 1945.
 Mluvnice spisovné češtiny. Část I., Hláskosloví, tvoření slov, tvarosloví. 1. vyd. 1948, další 1949, 1951.
 V roce 1948 poctěno Státní cenou.
 Mluvnice spisovné češtiny. Část 2, Skladba. 1. vyd. 1949, další 1951.
 Český jazykozpytný strukturalismus ve světle Stalinova učení o jazyce, 1951.
 O jazyce naší nové prózy, 1954.
 Historická mluvnice česká 3. Skladba. 1. vyd. 1956, další 1962.

References 

1888 births
1961 deaths
People from Blansko District
Czech philologists
Academic staff of Masaryk University
Academic staff of Charles University
Charles University alumni
Czech lithographers
Czech literary historians
Czech lexicographers
Czech science writers
Communist Party of Czechoslovakia politicians
Czech Marxists
Czechoslovak Marxists
Members of the National Assembly of Czechoslovakia (1948–1954)
Members of the National Assembly of Czechoslovakia (1954–1960)
Czechoslovak Legion personnel
Linguists from the Czech Republic
Burials at Brno Central Cemetery